The Frenchville Railroad Station and Water Tank are a historic railroad museum property in Frenchville, Maine. The station and water tank were built in 1910 by the Bangor & Aroostook Railroad (B&A) and were added to the National Register of Historic Places on June 20, 1995. The station was retired in 1971. The water tower became obsolete in 1958 when the diesel locomotive replaced the steam locomotive. The Town of Frenchville purchased the water tank from Bangor & Aroostook Railroad and used it as a water reservoir for the fire department until 1981. The Frenchville Historical Society took over maintenance of the site in 1985.

Description and history
The former Frenchville Railroad Station is located between United States Route 1 and the railroad tracks of the Bangor and Aroostook Railroad, west of the junction of US 1 and Maine State Route 162.  The station is a small rectangular wood frame building with a broadly-overhanging gable roof and weatherboard siding.  The building is divided into three sections: a central agent's room, a freight area to the east, and a passenger area to the west.  The inside walls are finished with pine wainscoting and decorative metal, which is continued onto the ceiling.  The station was built c. 1910 by the B&A, and remained in service until 1971.

Immediately east of the station is a short isolated section of track, on which stands a caboose. It was acquired by the B&A in 1949 and refitted as a caboose, remaining in service until 1981. It was donated to the Frenchville Historical Society in 1988.

It has an octagonal wooden base sheathed in weatherboard and set on a concrete pad. The tank is supported by a heavy timber frame, and is structurally reinforced by fifteen steel rods. The structure is topped by a polygonal roof. It was built c. 1910, and served the railroad as a water source for its steam engines until 1958, when the line was converted to diesel power. The town purchased the tank, and used it as a water reservoir for its fire department until 1981. Its maintenance was taken over by local citizens in 1985, and it is now owned by the Frenchville Historical Society.

See also
National Register of Historic Places listings in Aroostook County, Maine

References

External links
Frenchville Historical Society
B & A Caboose and Green Water Tank - St. John River Valley Attractions

Energy infrastructure completed in 1910
Transportation buildings and structures in Aroostook County, Maine
Museums in Aroostook County, Maine
Historic districts on the National Register of Historic Places in Maine
Water tanks on the National Register of Historic Places
National Register of Historic Places in Aroostook County, Maine